Tallabinnela Creek is a stream in the U.S. state of Mississippi.

Tallabinnela is a name derived from the Choctaw language or the Chickasaw language purported to mean (sources vary) "place where stone rests" or "the rock to get over". A variant name is "Talebenela Creek".

References

Rivers of Mississippi
Rivers of Chickasaw County, Mississippi
Rivers of Monroe County, Mississippi
Rivers of Pontotoc County, Mississippi